Doliella is a genus of sea snails, marine gastropod mollusks in the family Pyramidellidae, the pyrams and their allies.

Species
Species within the genus Doliella include:
 Doliella nitens (Jeffreys, 1870)

References

 Monterosato T. A. (di) (1880). Conchiglie della zona degli abissi. Bullettino della Società Malacologica Italiana,, Pisa, 6: 50-82

External links

 To World Register of Marine Species

Pyramidellidae